"Audio, Video, Disco" is a song by French duo Justice. It is the title track and second single from their second studio album Audio, Video, Disco. The band stated that the album is not named after the song, instead the song is named after the album.

Music video
The music video for "Audio, Video, Disco" was directed by So Me and released on 5 September 2011.

Track listing
Digital download EP
"Audio, Video, Disco." – 4:52
"Helix" – 4:31
"Audio, Video, Disco." (Para One Remix) – 6:16
"Audio, Video, Disco." (Mickey Moonlight Remix) – 4:50
Vinyl
"Audio, Video, Disco" – 4:52
"Helix" – 4:31

Charts

Notes

References

2011 singles
Justice (band) songs
2011 songs